The 1986 Atlanta Falcons season was the franchise's 21st season in the National Football League (NFL). It began with moderate expectations. Head coach Dan Henning was going into his fourth year having failed to post a record above .500 in any of his first three seasons. Local media, including the Atlanta Journal-Constitution, saw it as Henning's last chance to save his head coaching job.  Atlanta entered the season led by, among others, Gerald Riggs, Scott Case, Bill Fralic and Jeff Van Note. David Archer was the starting quarterback heading into the season.

The Falcons won their first 4 games, but their season was effectively ruined by going 3-8-1 afterwards.

Offseason

NFL Draft

Personnel

Staff

Roster

Regular season

Season summary
The Falcons began the 1986 season strong by winning their first four games 4–0 start, beating their NFC West rivals, the New Orleans Saints, 31–10 in the season opener. They opened at home in Atlanta with a 33–13 victory over the St. Louis Cardinals. Then, after a thrilling 37–35 win in Dallas, they beat the lowly Tampa Bay Buccaneers 23–20. The first loss came to the Philadelphia Eagles, whose strong defense coached by Buddy Ryan took care of the Falcons 16–0. Henning didn't let the loss affect his team as they beat the playoff bound Los Angeles Rams 26–14, putting the Falcons in first place with a record of 5-1. Things seemed to be going great for Atlanta, as they were able to tie the powerhouse San Francisco 49ers 10–10. Following the tie to the 49ers, a five-game slide derailed the season, starting with a 14–7 loss to the Rams, then a 25–17 loss to the defending AFC champion New England Patriots. They returned home to face the 8–1 New York Jets, where they lost 28–14 to drop them to 5–4–1. The next week a 13–10 loss to the Chicago Bears knocked them into last place in the division. Their last loss of the streak was a 20–0 loss to the 49ers. The now 5–6–1 Falcons ended their winless streak against the Miami Dolphins in a 20–14 victory. The nadir of the season came in a 28–23 loss to the Indianapolis Colts, who started the year 0–13, and was the Colts’ first win of the year. By that time, the Falcons were out of the playoff picture with Los Angeles and San Francisco already in. The Falcons dropped their last home game 14–9 to New Orleans. They concluded their season with a 20–6 victory against the Detroit Lions.

Schedule

Week 1

Standings

Rankings for 1986 season
Atlanta was 6th in scoring defense allowing 280 points, 21st in scoring offense scoring 280 points. Passing; 246 completions of 452 attempts for 3046 yards. David Archer threw for 10 of the teams 14 passing touchdowns, Turk Schonert threw the other four. Archer had nine of the teams 17 interceptions, and Schonert was picked the other eight times. The team rushed for 12 touchdowns nine of which came from Gerald Riggs, one from Schonert, one from William Andrews, one Cliff Austin.

References

External links
 1986 Atlanta Falcons at Pro-Football-Reference.com

Atlanta Falcons seasons
Atlanta
Atlanta